The Cathedral of St. James the Great  also called Beja Cathedral It is a religious building belonging to the Catholic Church and serves as the cathedral in Beja, Portugal, and the seat of the Diocese of Beja (Dioecesis Beiensis).

See also
 Roman Catholicism in Portugal

References

buildings and structures in Beja, Portugal
Beja
Roman Catholic churches completed in 1590
16th-century Roman Catholic church buildings in Portugal